I Got You (I Feel Good) is a compilation album by American musician James Brown. It consists primarily of songs released on previous studio albums (including an alternate take of the title track), as well as songs released on singles such as "Night Train", "I Can't Help It (I Just Do-Do-Do), and "Suds". The album was released on January 1, 1966.   Brown's vocal group , The Famous Flames ( Bobby Byrd, Bobby Bennett, & Lloyd Stallworth ), can be heard on the previously released hit songs, Think, and "Good Good Lovin" and two of them (Byrd and Stallworth), co-wrote (but did not sing) on Brown's hit, the previously-released  "Lost Someone".

Track listing
All tracks composed by James Brown; except where indicated

Chart positions

References

External links
 James Brown › Album › I Got You (I Feel Good) at MTV.com

1966 albums
James Brown albums
King Records (United States) albums